Frank J. Pistella (born April 22, 1951) is a former Democratic member of the Pennsylvania House of Representatives.

He is a 1969 graduate of Central District Catholic High School. He earned a degree in history from John Carroll University in 1973 and a certificate from the John F. Kennedy School of Government in 1985.

References

External links
 official PA House profile
 official Party website

Living people
Democratic Party members of the Pennsylvania House of Representatives
1951 births
John Carroll University alumni
Harvard Kennedy School alumni